Konstanty Bronisław Miodowicz (9 January 1951 – 23 August 2013) was a Polish politician. He was a member of Sejm from 1997 until mid-2013, mostly as a candidate from the Civic Platform.

Biography
Miodowicz was born in Gniewkowo.  A trained ethnographer, he graduated the Faculty of Philosophy and History at the Jagiellonian University in 1982. He also completed postgraduate studies in didactic methods and pedagogy at the University School of Physical Education in Kraków in 1986.

While in the fourth and fifth terms of the Sejm, starting in July 2004, he was elected to an inquiry commission to investigate Orlengate and questioned several people including Włodzimierz Cimoszewicz.

In May 2013, he collapsed while walking his dog in Busko-Zdrój. He was taken to a hospital where he underwent neurosurgery for a cerebral hemorrhage. He woke from a coma on 6 May. He returned to the hospital later in May for complications from surgery. He never fully recovered and died on 23 August 2013 at the age of 62.

Honors
 1993: Gold Cross of Merit  
 1995: Knight's Cross

See also
Members of Polish Sejm 2005-2007
Members of Polish Sejm 2007-2011

References

External links
Konstanty Miodowicz - parliamentary page - includes declarations of interest, voting record, and transcripts of speeches.

1951 births
2013 deaths
Civic Platform politicians
Members of the Polish Sejm 1997–2001
Members of the Polish Sejm 2001–2005
Members of the Polish Sejm 2005–2007
Members of the Polish Sejm 2007–2011